Martinsville Commercial Historic District is a national historic district located at Martinsville, Morgan County, Indiana.  The district encompasses 75 contributing buildings and 1 contributing object in the central business district of Martinsville.  It developed between about 1847 and 1947, and includes notable examples of Italianate, Classical Revival, and Tudor Revival style architecture.  Located in the district are the separately listed Morgan County Courthouse and Blackstone House and Martinsville Telephone Company Building.  Other notable buildings are the Martinsville Public Library (1906, 1990), Martinsville City Hall (1917), Martinsville Post Office (1935, 1974), Pitkin Building (c. 1900), Barskin's Department Store (1922), Indiana Theater (1914, 1927, 1939), Steven's House / Building (c. 1847, c. 1915), Hale Building (c. 1860, 1917), Interurban Station (1902, c. 1956), Union Block (1866), and First Christian Church (1891) and Annex (1927).

It was listed on the National Register of Historic Places in 1998.

References

Historic districts on the National Register of Historic Places in Indiana
Italianate architecture in Indiana
Neoclassical architecture in Indiana
Tudor Revival architecture in Indiana
Historic districts in Morgan County, Indiana
National Register of Historic Places in Morgan County, Indiana